Anna King, is a Scottish landscape artist "who seeks out forgotten spaces and derelict buildings."

She was born in Shetland, spent most of her life in the Scottish Borders, and lives in the village of Greenlaw, near Kelso.

She first came to attention of the general public at her degree show at  Dundee's Duncan of Jordanstone College of Art and Design in 2005.

Awards

In 2017, she won the top prize of £20,000 in the annual Jolomo Award, established by John Lowrie Morrison and awarded to Scottish Landscape Artists.

She also received the Royal Scottish Academy Landscape Award from the RSA Student Exhibition and also received the Ian Eadie Award from the Duncan of Jordanstone College of Art and Design

Exhibitions

She has had solo exhibitions at:

 Open Eye Gallery in Edinburgh
 Beaux Art Gallery Bath 
 108 Fine Art, Harrogate 

She has also exhibited at many other art galleries including the Glasgow Art Fair and the Gallery Heinzel.

TV

She featured on the BBC Coast Series, when Alice Roberts visited her during one of her residencies at the Watchie and explored what drew Joan Eardley to Catterline. Also she is the featured artist in a recent Blackberry Ad  which shows William Ramsay, founder of the Affordable Art Fair, visiting the artist and then using his BlackBerry Torch to share her paintings with his colleagues. She also featured in a BBC program "Making Art Work: First Idea to Final Piece"

Art

She normally works in oil and pencil, on paper and board.

"This gifted young artist has spent the past two winters working at Joan Eardley's clifftop studio at Catterline. The results are very different from Eardley's wild, densely painted seascapes: cooler, more cerebral, with an almost icy range of colours. Yet something of Eardley's response to nature as an untameable force is echoed in King's bleakly attractive images of post-industrial landscapes: empty feral places where nature is slowly reclaiming the land."

References

External links
 Official web site 
 Painter Anna King tells why barren spaces and discarded objects inspire her, New Scotsman, 30 May 2009, by Susan Mansfield
   Red Lorry Yellow Lorry Scotland on Sunday, Aidan Smith 6 January 2008
Bio. of Anna King at "108 Fine Art"

Year of birth missing (living people)
Living people
21st-century Scottish painters
21st-century Scottish women artists
Alumni of the University of Dundee
People from Shetland
Scottish landscape painters
Scottish women painters